The Hikurangi Trench, also called the Hikurangi Trough, is an oceanic trench in the bed of the Pacific Ocean off the east coast of the North Island of New Zealand, lying between the southern end of the Cook Strait and the Chatham Rise. It is the southward continuation of the much deeper Kermadec Trench. It lies in the Hikurangi Margin subduction zone, which is the southern extension of the Kermadec-Tonga subduction zone. The Hikurangi Margin is the subduction zone where the thick oceanic Hikurangi Plateau is subducting beneath continental crust of the Indo-Australian Plate. By contrast, the Kermadec and Tonga trenches represent the parts of the subduction zone where oceanic crust of the Pacific Plate is subducting beneath oceanic crust of the Indo-Australian Plate.

Although shallower than the trenches north of it, the Hikurangi Trench reaches depths of 3,000 metres as close as 80 kilometres from shore.

At the southern end of the trench, off the coast of the Marlborough region, the seabed rises sharply, and because of the prevailing winds and tides in this area, many deep water species are found close to the shore. This food source attracts the whales for which the town of Kaikoura is famous.

The plate boundary continues inland along the Marlborough Fault System, linking through to the Alpine Fault. Here the plates converge much more obliquely, exhibiting transpression instead of subduction.

See also 
Geology of New Zealand
Kaikōura Canyon

References

 

Zealandia
Geography of the New Zealand seabed
Oceanic trenches of the Pacific Ocean
Subduction zones